is a Japanese footballer. He currently plays for the J2 League club Albirex Niigata.

Club statistics
Updated to 5 May 2021.

1Includes Japanese Super Cup, FIFA Club World Cup and J. League Championship.

National team statistics

Honours

Club
Sanfrecce Hiroshima
J1 League: 2012, 2013, 2015
Japanese Super Cup: 2013, 2014, 2016

International
Japan
EAFF East Asian Cup: 2013

References

External links

 
 Japan National Football Team Database
 
 Profile at Sanfrecce Hiroshima 
 Profile at Albirex Niigata
 

1985 births
Living people
Association football people from Hokkaido
Japanese footballers
Japan international footballers
Eerste Divisie players
J1 League players
J2 League players
AGOVV Apeldoorn players
FC Dordrecht players
Albirex Niigata players
Sanfrecce Hiroshima players
Nagoya Grampus players
Japanese expatriate footballers
Expatriate footballers in the Netherlands
Japanese expatriate sportspeople in the Netherlands
Association football defenders
People from Kushiro, Hokkaido